Msunduzi may refer to:
The Msunduzi River, in KwaZulu-Natal
The Msunduzi Local Municipality, named after the river